was a train station in Makubetsu, Nakagawa District, Hokkaidō, Japan.

Lines
Hokkaido Railway Company
Nemuro Main Line Station K33

Adjacent stations

References

Railway stations in Hokkaido Prefecture
Makubetsu, Hokkaido
Defunct railway stations in Japan